HMS Prospero was a 14-gun Crocus-class brig of the Royal Navy, launched in 1809. She captured a handful of small vessels, including one privateer. The Navy sold her in 1816 for breaking up.

Career
Commander John Hardy Godby was appointed to command of Prospero on 18 November 1809. On 16 April 1810 she sailed with the Halifax convoy. Between 1811 and 1813 she served on the North Sea Station.

On 17 February 1811, Prospero destroyed a Danish privateer cutter, of two guns and 25 men, near Christiansand, on the coast of Norway. The Navy paid head money for the crew of the privateer in 1832. 

On 16 March Prospero was in company with Acquilon and Raven at the capture of the Danish vessel Sarah Christina.

Cretan and Leveret were in company on 12 (or 15) March 1813 and so shared in the proceeds of the capture of the Danish vessel Aurora. Two days later, Cretan and Raven captured Anna Brouer; Prospero shared by agreement. That same day Prospero captured Najaden; Cretan and Raven shared in the proceeds by agreement. 

On 29 March Prospero captured Quatres Freres; Raven shared by agreement in the proceeds.

Commander Godby was promoted to post captain on 27 June 1814. Commander George Greensill re-commissioned Prospero in August.

Fate
The "Principal Officers and Commissioners of His Majesty's Navy" offered Prospero for sale on 18 April 1816 at Woolwich. She finally sold on 30 May for £720 for breaking up.

Notes, citations, & references
Notes

Citations

References
 
 

1809 ships
Brigs of the Royal Navy